The 2011 international cricket season was from April 2011 to September 2011. The season saw England take the ICC Test Championship number-one ranking from India when England defeated India in a home Test series 4–0. Australia continued to top the ICC ODI Championship rankings, a position they had held since September 2009. India, despite winning the ICC World Cup the previous season, dropped from number two to number five in September 2011 after losing 0–3 in a five-match ODI series in England.

Season overview

Pre-Season rankings

April

ICC World Cricket League Division Two

Group stage

Final Placings

Australia in Bangladesh

Pakistan in the West Indies

May

ICC World Cricket League Division Seven

Group stage

Final Placings

Sri Lanka in England

Pakistan in Ireland

June

India in the West Indies

Netherlands in Scotland

July

Namibia in Ireland

Tri-Nation Series in Scotland

India in England

UAE in Kenya

August

Afghanistan in Canada

Bangladesh in Zimbabwe

Australia in Sri Lanka

Cricket Canada Summer Festival

England in Ireland

September

Pakistan in Zimbabwe

Kenya in the Netherlands

Canada in Ireland

World Cricket League Division Six

Final Placings

West Indies in England

Scotland in Namibia

References

External links
2011 season in ESPN Cricinfo

2011 in cricket